China Medical University may refer to:

 China Medical University (PRC) (中国医科大学), in Shenyang, Liaoning
 China Medical University (ROC) (中國醫藥大學), in Taichung, Taiwan